Nzagi Airport  is an airport serving Nzagi (Andrada) in the Lunda Norte Province, in northeastern Angola.

See also

 List of airports in Angola
 Transport in Angola

References

External links
 
OpenStreetMap - Nzagi
 

Nzagi